Taito Memories is a series of video game compilations published by Taito in Japan. A total of five collections were released from 2005 to 2007 — four on the PlayStation 2, and one on the PlayStation Portable. The PlayStation 2 entries each have twenty-five titles, while the PlayStation Portable game has sixteen. The collections contain arcade games developed by Taito throughout the 1980s and 1990s. A similar series of collections, Taito Legends, was released outside Japan in North America and Europe, which retained many of the games included in the Taito Memories collections. The first two compilations sold a total of 145,616 copies.

Games

Taito Memories Jōkan
The first entry, Taito Memories Jōkan, was released on July 28, 2005. It would be re-released under two different budget labels - first under the Taito BEST label on July 7, 2006 and the second under Eternal Hits on June 28, 2007. Among the included titles, KiKi KaiKai, Bubble Bobble, Syvalion, Cameltry and Metal Black are locked, and can be accessed by inserting a code in the title screen - the reprints of the game would have these games available from the start.

Taito Memories Gekan
The second entry, Taito Memories Gekan, was released on August 25, 2005. It would be re-released under two different budget labels - first under the Taito BEST label on July 9, 2006 and the second under Eternal Hits on June 28, 2007. Among the included titles, Qix, Elevator Action, Front Line, The NewZealand Story and Gun Frontier are locked, and can be accessed by inserting a code in the title screen - the reprints of the game would have these games available from the start. The ports of both RayStorm and G-Darius are instead the PlayStation versions instead of the arcade releases.

Taito Memories Pocket
This compilation is a portable version only available for the PlayStation Portable, and was released in Japan on January 5, 2006. It includes 16 titles, four of which are featuring an additional remake version.

Taito Memories II Jōkan
This compilation saw its release on January 25, 2007.

Taito Memories II Gekan
This is the final compilation, released in Japan on March 29, 2007.

Reception

Notes

References

External links
 TAiTO on jap-sai.com
 Taito Memories on NCSX (National Console Support)

Video game franchises
Square Enix video game compilations
Taito games
Taito video game compilations
PlayStation 2 games
Video games developed in Japan